Somerset is an incorporated town in Montgomery County, Maryland, United States, located near its border with Washington, D.C. The population was 1,216 at the 2010 census. Somerset has no relationship to Somerset County, some 150 miles distant.

Geography
Somerset is located at  (38.967110, −77.094824).

Demographics

2010 census
As of the census of 2010, there were 1,216 people, 407 households, and 347 families living in the town. The racial makeup of the town was 91.7% White, 0.7% African American, 3.9% Asian, 1.0% from other races, and 2.7% from two or more races. Hispanic or Latino of any race were 4.8% of the population.

There were 407 households, of which 44.5% had children under the age of 18 living with them, 76.2% were married couples living together, 6.6% had a female householder with no husband present, 2.5% had a male householder with no wife present, and 14.7% were non-families. 10.8% of all households were made up of individuals, and 8.1% had someone living alone who was 65 years of age or older. The average household size was 2.99 and the average family size was 3.18.

The median age in the town was 45.5 years. 31% of residents were under the age of 18; 4.8% were between the ages of 18 and 24; 13.4% were from 25 to 44; 33% were from 45 to 64; and 17.7% were 65 years of age or older. The gender makeup of the town was 48.5% male and 51.5% female.

2000 census
As of the census of 2000, there were 1,124 people, 406 households, and 326 families living in the town. The racial makeup of the town was 94.04% White, 0.89% African American, 3.38% Asian, 0.89% from other races, and 0.80% from two or more races. Hispanic or Latino of any race were 2.94% of the population.

There were 406 households, out of which 38.7% had children under the age of 18 living with them, 74.1% were married couples living together, 4.9% had a female householder with no husband present, and 19.7% were non-families. 16.0% of all households were made up of individuals, and 11.1% had someone living alone who was 65 years of age or older. The average household size was 2.77 and the average family size was 3.05.

In the town, the population was spread out, with 28.1% under the age of 18, 3.5% from 18 to 24, 16.5% from 25 to 44, 32.7% from 45 to 64, and 19.3% who were 65 years of age or older. The median age was 46 years. For every 100 females, there were 98.6 males. For every 100 females age 18 and over, there were 87.5 males.

The median income for a household in the town was $144,523, and the median income for a family was $149,057. Males had a median income of $100,000 versus $80,762 for females. The per capita income for the town was $82,368. None of the families and 2.7% of the population were living below the poverty line, including no under eighteens and none of those over 64.

History 
Somerset's history dates back to 1890, when five government scientists purchased  parcel of tobacco farmland from the government for the purpose of setting up a residential community. Five early streets were arranged and remain to this day: Dorset, Warwick, Surrey, Cumberland, and Essex after the English counties. The first home in Somerset was occupied by Dr. Charles A. Crampton in 1893, and by 1905 there were 35 residences.

Despite being promoted as an area of "tranquility and refinement," the original Town was plagued by inadequate water drainage, a makeshift sewage system, and the absence of local fire protection and schools. These problems prompted the local citizens to petition the state of Maryland for incorporation into a township so that taxes could be levied to provide these basic services. The Charter was issued in 1906, forming the community of Somerset Heights and the surrounding areas into the Town of Somerset. The first Town Council was elected on May 7, 1906, and Dr. Crampton was elected as the first mayor.

In 1988, town residents voted in a referendum to de-annex a parcel of land containing three large apartment buildings under construction, to avoid having the town council and services shift from representing the single-family homeowners to becoming representative of a condo community. Residents of the Somerset House complex would have out-numbered the single-family home dwellers by 3–1. The complex was constructed on the last large undeveloped woodlot in Somerset, and construction had been blocked by legal challenges for over two decades.

Education
Montgomery County Public Schools serves Somerset.

Residents are zoned to:
 Somerset Elementary School
 Westland Middle School
 Bethesda-Chevy Chase High School

Transportation

No state highways directly serve Somerset. The most significant road within the town limits is Little Falls Parkway. Maryland Route 190 (River Road) passes just southwest of the town limits, and Maryland Route 355 (Wisconsin Avenue) is located just east of the town limits. Both connect southeastward to Washington, D.C. and northwestward to the nearest Interstate highway, Interstate 495 (the Capital Beltway).

References

External links

 Town of Somerset Homepage

1906 establishments in Maryland
Populated places established in 1906
Suburbs of Washington, D.C.
Towns in Montgomery County, Maryland
Upper class culture in Maryland